Just to Be Sure is a 2017 French-Belgian comedy film directed by Carine Tardieu. It was screened in the Directors' Fortnight section at the 2017 Cannes Film Festival. It received two nominations at the 8th Magritte Awards.

Cast
 François Damiens as Erwan Gourmelon
 Cécile De France as Doctor Anna Levkine
 Guy Marchand as Bastien Gourmelon
 André Wilms as Joseph Levkine
 Alice de Lencquesaing as Juliette Gourmelon
 Lyes Salem as Madjid
 Brigitte Roüan as Cécile
 Nadège Beausson-Diagne as The mother of the young girl

Reception
On review aggregator Rotten Tomatoes, the film holds an approval rating of 85%, based on 13 reviews with an average rating of 6.6/10.

References

External links
 

2017 films
2017 comedy-drama films
Belgian comedy-drama films
French comedy-drama films
2010s French-language films
French-language Belgian films
2010s French films